Pancho Villa Returns is a 1950 film directed by Miguel Contreras Torres and starring Leo Carrillo as the famous Mexican revolutionary general, Pancho Villa.

Made simultaneously with Vuelve Pancho Villa, this film used the same script but the other film had Pedro Armendariz playing Villa instead of Carrillo.

Cast

Leo Carrillo – Pancho Villa
Rodolfo Acosta – Martin Corona

References

External links
 
 

1950 films
English-language Mexican films
Mexican Revolution films
1950s multilingual films
Mexican multilingual films
1950 drama films
Mexican drama films
Mexican black-and-white films
1950s English-language films
1950s Mexican films